The Philippines national athletics team represents the Philippines at the international athletics competitions such as Olympic Games or World Athletics Championships. Philippine Athletics Track and Field Association (PATAFA) is the governing body of athletics in the Philippines. The first participation of the Philippines in an international competition was at the Far Eastern Games in 1913. As for the olympics, their first participation began in 1924 and has continued every summer olympics except for the 1980 Moscow Olympics. The first win that the Philippines national athletics team had won though was the olympic games, receiving a bronze medal in the Men's 200 meters breaststroke, won by Teófilo Yldefonso, in the 1928 Amsterdam summer Olympics.

Medal count

Asian Athletic Championship

All-time Medal Tally (Athletics)

List of Asian Athletics Championships medalists

Asian Games

All-time Medal Tally (Athletics)

Athletics

Athletics is one of the core sports of the Asian games.  Mona Sulaiman has the most gold medal with three.

Year introduced: 1951 
First medal : 1951 
Last medal: 1994

100 meters

200 meters

400 meters

800 meters

 Relay

 Relay

Discus Throw

High Jump

Hurdles

Javelin Throw

Long Jump

Pentathlon

Shot Put

Steeplechase

SEA Games

All-time Medal Tally (Athletics)

Olympic Games

Year introduced: 1896 
First medal : 1932 
Last medal: 1936

List of Olympic Medalists

All-time Medal Tally (Athletics)

Records

Coaches
These are the national team coaches who have been appointed by PATAFA.

See also
Philippine Athletics Track and Field Association

References

National team
Philippines
Athletics